Jon Sonju (born December 26, 1975) is a former member of the Montana Senate.  He is a Republican from Senate District 4, representing Kalispell, Montana, elected in 2011. He served as a State Senator until 2015. He previously served in the Montana House of Representatives from 2005 to 2010.

See also 
 Montana House of Representatives, District 7

References

External links
Jon Sonju at Ballotpedia
Project Vote Smart – Jon Sonju (MT) profile
Our Campaigns – Jon Sonju (MT) profile

|-

|-

1975 births
Living people
Republican Party members of the Montana House of Representatives
Republican Party Montana state senators
Politicians from Kalispell, Montana
Montana State University Billings alumni
21st-century American politicians